MDT may refer to:

Businesses and organizations
 Medtronic, an Irish medical technology company
 Minnesota Dance Theatre, a dance school and company in Minneapolis, Minnesota, United States
 MDT Armor Corporation, an American military equipment company, known for the MDT David light armored vehicle

Horology
 Mean down time, the average time that a system is non-operational
 Mountain Daylight Time in North America (UTC−6)

Science and technology 
 Maggot debridement therapy, usage of live maggots to clean wounds with necrotic tissue
 Microsoft Deployment Toolkit, a tool for deployment of operating systems created by Microsoft
 Mobile data terminal, a type of communications equipment
 Mode deactivation therapy, a psychotherapeutic approach that addresses dysfunctional emotions
 McKenzie method, a fringe theory in physical therapy

Transportation
 Harrisburg International Airport, an airport in Middletown, Pennsylvania, United States, IATA code MDT
 Miami-Dade Transit, the public transportation agency for Miami, Florida, U.S.
 Montana Department of Transportation

ca:MDT